Hans Kuster (born 5 June 1920) was a Swiss figure skater. He competed in the pairs event at the 1948 Winter Olympics.

References

External links
 

1920 births
Possibly living people
Swiss male pair skaters
Olympic figure skaters of Switzerland
Figure skaters at the 1948 Winter Olympics
Place of birth missing (living people)